The Corporate Manslaughter and Corporate Homicide Act 2007 (c. 19) is an Act of the Parliament of the United Kingdom that seeks to broaden the law on corporate manslaughter in the United Kingdom. The Act created a new offence respectively named corporate manslaughter in England and Wales and Northern Ireland, and corporate homicide in Scotland.

The Act received the royal assent on 26 July 2007 and came into force on 6 April 2008.

Background 

In the United Kingdom, a corporation is considered a juristic person and can be capable of committing, being convicted of and sentenced for, a criminal offence. However, some conceptual difficulty lies in fixing a corporation with the appropriate mens rea. Before the Act, a corporation could only be convicted of manslaughter if a single employee of the company committed all the elements of the offence and was of sufficient seniority to be seen as embodying the "mind" of the corporation. The practical consequence of this was that such convictions were rare and there was public discontent where it was perceived that culpable corporations had escaped censure and punishment.

A Corporate Manslaughter and Corporate Homicide Bill was introduced to the House of Commons by Home Secretary John Reid on 20 July 2006.

The Act

The offence
The Act attempts to align the offence of corporate killing north and south of the border. An indictable offence is committed if the way in which an organisation's activities are managed or organised:
Causes a person's death; and
Amounts to a gross breach of a relevant duty of care owed by the organisation to the deceased;

— and the way in which its activities are managed or organised by its senior management is a substantial element in the breach. Prosecution in England or Wales requires the permission of the Director of Public Prosecutions, and in Northern Ireland, the Director of Public Prosecutions for Northern Ireland and no natural person can be charged with aiding and abetting the offence. In Scotland, all prosecutions are initiated by the Procurator Fiscal. The common law offence of gross negligence manslaughter, as it applies to corporations, is abolished.

Organisations liable
The offence applies to:
Corporations;
Partnerships, trade unions and employers' associations, that are themselves employers.
Police forces;
Various, but not all, government departments;

Relevant duty of care
A relevant duty of care is one of several duties of care owed by the organisation under the law of negligence and is a question of law for the judge. Various government policy decisions; policing, military and child protection activities; and emergency responses are excluded.

There are particular duties of care owed to persons in custody (s. 2(1)(d)) and, owing to the sensitivity and difficulty of such duties, implementation of this section was delayed. The Ministry of Justice published a report on progress towards implementation in July 2008.

Gross breach
A breach of a duty of care by an organisation is a gross breach if the alleged conduct amounts to a breach of that duty that falls far below what can reasonably be expected of the organisation in the circumstances. The jury must consider whether the evidence shows that the organisation failed to comply with any health and safety legislation that relates to the alleged breach, and if so:
How serious that failure was; and
How much of a risk of death it posed.
The jury may also:
Consider the extent to which the evidence shows that there were attitudes, policies, systems or accepted practices within the organisation that were likely to have encouraged the failure, or to have produced tolerance of it; and
Have regard to any health and safety guidance that relates to the alleged breach.

Senior management
Senior management means the persons who play significant roles in:
The making of decisions about how the whole or a substantial part of its activities are to be managed or organised; or
The actual managing or organising of the whole or a substantial part of those activities.

Penalties
On conviction a corporation may be ordered to remedy any breach, or to publicise its failures, or be given an unlimited fine. The Sentencing Guidelines Council issued a steps based definitive guideline, effective from 1 February 2016, for sentencing the offence of corporate manslaughter. The recommendations of the guideline are based on the size and turnover of the organisations with a starting fine of £300,000 and a no limit maximum. If an individual is also found liable for the offence of manslaughter, it can be prosecuted under the Health and Safety at Work Act 1974 ruled by the same sentencing guideline.

Convictions

References

Bibliography

External links

The Corporate Manslaughter and Corporate Homicide Act 2007, as amended from the National Archives.
The Corporate Manslaughter and Corporate Homicide Act 2007, as originally enacted from the National Archives.
Explanatory notes to the Corporate Manslaughter and Corporate Homicide Act 2007.

United Kingdom Acts of Parliament 2007
Corporate crime
Criminal law of the United Kingdom
Manslaughter in the United Kingdom
Homicide